Athlitikos Eksoraistikos Syllogos Diagoras Stefanovikeio is a Greek football club based in Stefanovikeio, Greece.

Honours

National
 Fourth Tier Champions: 1
 2020-21

Domestic
 Thessaly FCA Champions: 1
 2018–19

References

Football clubs in Thessaly
Association football clubs established in 1957
1957 establishments in Greece
Gamma Ethniki clubs